Notre Dame de Tyre or Our Lady of Tyre, or simply as Armenian church is a monastic church in Nicosia, Cyprus. It is located in the Arab Ahmet quarter, in Salahi Şevket Street, formerly known as Victoria Street.

History
It is believed that the original church, known as the Benedictine Abbey of Our Lady of Tyre, was founded in the 13th century as a principal convent following the fall of Jerusalem. In 1308, the Lusignan king, Henry II of Jerusalem, repaired the church after it was destroyed by an earthquake. As many of the nuns were Armenian in origin, it came under the Armenian Church before 1504.

In 1570, following the capture of Nicosia by the Ottomans, the keeping of the Paphos Gate, the church, and the surrounding area were  handed over to the Armenians by Sultan Selim II.

The Armenian Prelature of Cyprus was housed next to the church, until the 1963-1964 intercommunal violence, when it was placed in the Turkish Cypriot quarter of the city. In 1920 the descendants of Artin Melikian restored the church, and built the Melikian Elementary School on the grounds of the church. In 1938, the Ouzounian Elementary School was established by Dikran Ouzounian. There was also a kindergarten, originally built in 1902 and called Shoushanian.

Inside the complex was also the Armenian genocide monument, built in 1932, the second oldest of its kind around the world. Opposite the church complex, to the west, were the Nicosia AGBU premises, while to the south the Armenian Club was located. Very near the complex were also the premises of AYMA.

Since 1963, the church has been located in North Nicosia, under Turkish Cypriot administration. The church suffered the collapse of some parts and a great deterioration of condition till 2007, when the restoration work began.

Architecture and Sepulchral Monuments
The existing building is gothic in style and consists of a square nave, with a semi-octagonal apse, cross vaults an arch covering the western part, a bell tower (built in 1860) and convent buildings to the north of the church. To the east of the nunnery buildings is the sarcophagus of Lady Dampierre, an Abbess of the nunnery. A number of tomb slabs in the floor of the church dating from the 14th and 15th centuries were noted in the nineteenth and early twentieth centuries, but these were lifted in the 1960s as a conservation measure and kept in the north porch.

Restoration
The church was reportedly damaged following its placement in the Turkish Cypriot part of the city following the 1963 division and the 1974 Turkish invasion of Cyprus. After 1963, it suffered from neglect and misuse, which put it in dire need of repair as some parts collapsed. In 2007, the UNDP began working on its preservation and restoration. The renovation was completed in 2013 and won the EU Prize For Cultural Heritage (Europa Nostra Award) in 2015.

See also
Armenians in Cyprus
John of Ibelin (jurist)

References

External links
cyprus.gov.cy

Buildings and structures completed in the 14th century
Armenian diaspora in Cyprus
Cypriot Orthodox monasteries
Churches in Northern Cyprus
Historic sites in Cyprus
Gothic architecture in Cyprus
Armenian churches in Cyprus